Locust Grove, also known as the Old Jacob Brubaker House is a historic house in rural Page County, Virginia. It is set on the south side of the road, just west of Chub Run. It is a -story brick house, with a gable roof, and a single-story side ell. Built about 1830, it is a good local example of Federal period style, retaining original interior floors, woodwork, and fireplace mantels.

The house was listed on the National Register of Historic Places in 2015.

See also
National Register of Historic Places listings in Page County, Virginia

References

Houses on the National Register of Historic Places in Virginia
Federal architecture in Virginia
Houses completed in 1930
Houses in Page County, Virginia
National Register of Historic Places in Page County, Virginia